Actinopus apiacas is a species of mygalomorph spider in the family Actinopodidae. It can be found in Brazil.

The specific name apiacas refers to Apiacás, a municipality in the state of Mato Grosso, Brazil.

References 

apiacas